Ameir bin Hassan (Jawi: امياير بن حسن) is a Malaysian politician. He was the Pakatan Harapan state chief for Perlis until he was replace by Noor Amin Ahmad on 10 May 2021.

References

Living people
Year of birth missing (living people)
Place of birth missing (living people)
Malaysian United Indigenous Party politicians
People from Perlis
21st-century Malaysian politicians